Protium copal, commonly known as the copal tree, is a species of tree endemic to Mexico and Central America. It is found in wet tropical forests, preferring heavy shade. The fruits are small (2–3 cm) and smooth, with a single pit.

The dried sap of the tree is known as copal. It is commonly used as an incense, similar to frankincense.

References

copal
Trees of Belize
Trees of Guatemala
Trees of Mexico
Cloud forest flora of Mexico